Wei Jian (born 6 January 1991) is a Chinese footballer who played as a goalkeeper. He is retired from football.

Personal life
Wei is the brother of fellow professional footballer, Wei Chao.

Career statistics

Club
.

Notes

References

1991 births
Living people
People from Guiyang
Footballers from Guizhou
Chinese footballers
China youth international footballers
Association football goalkeepers
China League One players
China League Two players
Guizhou F.C. players
Shenzhen F.C. players
Sichuan Longfor F.C. players
S.U. Sintrense players
Chinese expatriate footballers
Chinese expatriate sportspeople in Portugal
Expatriate footballers in Portugal